Anglo-Indian cuisine is the cuisine that developed during the British Raj in India. It was brought to England in the 1930s by the Veeraswamy restaurant, followed by a few others, but not by typical Indian restaurants. The cuisine introduced dishes such as kedgeree, mulligatawny and pish pash to English palates. One of the few Anglo-Indian foods that has had a lasting impact on English cuisine is chutney.

Anglo-Indian cuisine was documented in detail by the English colonel Arthur Robert Kenney-Herbert, writing as "Wyvern" in 1885 to advise the British Raj's memsahibs what to instruct their Indian cooks to make. Many of its usages are described in the "wonderful" 1886 Anglo-Indian dictionary, Hobson-Jobson. More recently, the cuisine has been analysed by Jennifer Brennan in 1990 and David Burton in 1993.

History
During the British rule in India, local British officials began mixing Indian dishes with their British palates and creating Anglo-Indian cuisine, with dishes such as kedgeree (1790) and mulligatawny soup (1791). The first Indian restaurant in England, the Hindoostane Coffee House, opened in 1809 in London; as described in The Epicure's Almanack in 1815, "All the dishes were dressed with curry powder, rice, Cayenne, and the best spices of Arabia. A room was set apart for smoking hookahs with oriental herbs". Indian food was cooked at home from a similar date as cookbooks of the time, including the 1758 edition of Hannah Glasse's The Art of Cookery, attest.

Dishes

Well-known Anglo-Indian dishes include chutneys, salted beef tongue, kedgeree, ball curry, fish rissoles, and mulligatawny soup. Chutney, one of the few Indian dishes that has had a lasting influence on English cuisine, is a cooked and sweetened but not highly spiced preparation of fruit, nuts or vegetables. It borrows from a tradition of jam making where an equal amount of sour fruit and refined sugar reacts with the pectin in the fruit such as sour apples or rhubarb, the sour note being provided by vinegar. Major Grey's Chutney is typical.

Pish pash was defined by Hobson-Jobson as "a slop of rice-soup with small pieces of meat in it, much used in the Anglo-Indian nursery". The term was first recorded by Augustus Prinsep in the mid 19th century. The name comes from the Persian pash-pash, from pashidan, to break. A version of the dish is given in The Cookery Book of Lady Clark of Tillypronie of 1909.

Restaurants

Some early restaurants in England, such as the Hindoostane Coffee House on George Street, London, which opened in 1810, served Anglo-Indian food.
Many Indian restaurants, however, have reverted to the standard mix-and-match Indian dishes that are better known to the British public.

References

Further reading

External links
 "Food Stories" — Explore a century of revolutionary change in UK food culture on the British Library's Food Stories website
 
 
 "Indian Food" —  Authentic Indian Cuisine in the UK.

 "Best Indian Restaurant in London" — Have a look to the best Indian food restaurants in London to the History_of_Indian_cuisine's Holy Cow website
 
British fusion cuisine
Indian fusion cuisine